The 1953-54 Oberliga season was the sixth season of the Oberliga, the top level of ice hockey in Germany. Eight teams participated in the league, and EV Füssen won the championship.

Regular season

Relegation 
SC Weßling - EV Rosenheim 3:3

References

Oberliga (ice hockey) seasons
West
Ger